Patrick Leonard Symcox (born 14 April 1960) is a former South African international cricketer. He played 20 Test matches and 80 One Day Internationals in the 1990s.

International career
Symcox was a right-arm off-spin bowler and was known for his powerful hitting down the order and has a Test century to his name, scored against Pakistan. Symcox is co-holder of the highest ever ninth-wicket partnership of 195 runs. Symcox retired in 1998. His son, Russel, like his father, used to play provincial cricket for the Natal Dolphins. His father Rodger, also played provincial cricket for Griqualand West and the Symcox family are one of ten families in South Africa to have seen three generations play first-class cricket.

During an ODI against Australia at the SCG in late-1997, play was stopped after the crowd pelted Symcox with projectiles, including an entire chicken.

After cricket
He has commentated for Supersport and ESPN Star Sports on cricket around the world.

Symcox now owns the REMAX property franchise on the South Coast of Kwa-Zulu Natal in South Africa known as RE/MAX Coast & Country which is active in the residential and commercial property sector.

He is also a popular after-dinner speaker and plays golf off a single figure handicap. Known as one of the tough men of the 90's Protea cricket team, he played under Kepler Wessels and Hansie Cronje. Prior to his cricketing career, Symcox also managed private hospitals and worked for Masters International acting as a managing agent for many of the top sportsmen of South Africa.

In his spare time his hobbies include angling.

References

1960 births
Living people
Griqualand West cricketers
KwaZulu-Natal cricketers
Northerns cricketers
South Africa One Day International cricketers
South Africa Test cricketers
South African cricketers
South African cricket commentators
South African cricket coaches